Medidata Solutions is an American technology company that develops and markets software as a service (SaaS) for clinical trials. These include protocol development, clinical site collaboration and management; randomization and trial supply management; capturing patient data through web forms, mobile health (mHealth) devices, laboratory reports, and imaging systems; quality monitor management; safety event capture; and monitoring and business analytics. Headquartered in New York City, Medidata has locations in China, Japan, Singapore, South Korea, the United Kingdom, and the United States.

Medidata's customers include pharmaceutical, biotechnology, medical device, and diagnostic companies; academic and government institutions; contract research organizations; and other life sciences organizations around the world that develop and bring medical therapies and products to market.

History 
The company was founded in June 1999 by Tarek Sherif, Glen de Vries and Ed Ikeguchi. In 1994, de Vries and Ikeguchi created OceanTek, a startup that developed Web applications for conducting clinical trials and was the precursor to Medidata. In 1999, they restarted the company as a new firm and, together with Sherif, formed Medidata, to provide online systems for designing and running clinical trials. In 2004, they completed a $10 million round of financing with Insight Venture Partners, and were later backed by investors including Milestone Venture Partners and Stonehenge Capital Fund. Ikeguchi left the company in 2008, and de Vries moved from chief technology officer to president, with Tarek as chief executive officer.

On January 26, 2009, Medidata filed to raise $86 million in an initial public offering (IPO). It made its IPO on the Nasdaq Stock Market on June 25, 2009, with its market capitalization at $313 million. It debuted on the Nasdaq at $18 per share. The company was ranked #11 on Fortune magazine's 2017 Fortune Future 50 list,#51 on the Fortune 100 Fastest Growing Companies list, and #59 on the Forbes list of Most Innovative Growth Companies, at a value of $3.3 billion as of May 2017. In 2018, Medidata was ranked #70 on Barron's 100 Most Sustainable Companies list.

In December 2019, Medidata was acquired by Dassault Systèmes.
Medidata  now functions as a subsidiary.

Acquisitions

Software
Medidata offers a cloud-based platform for clients to build their own clinical trials and perform medical research. On the platform, physicians and scientists can collect and share clinical trial data. The company helps biopharmaceutical and medical device companies run clinical trials, and streamlines the process for life science firms designing the trials. As of 2017, Medidata customers include 18 of the world's top 25 pharmaceutical companies, with clients such as Johnson & Johnson, AstraZeneca, Amgen, Cancer Research UK, GlaxoSmithKline, Novartis and Hoffmann-La Roche. Clients also include biotechnology companies, government institutions, and contract research organizations.

The company has two primary products. Medidata Rave EDC, its flagship product, introduced in 2001, is a single system for electronic data capture and clinical data management, allowing client data to be accessible in one place. Medidata Rave Clinical Cloud, introduced in 2013, is a platform used for data capture and management of patient-related data for clinical operations. In February 2018, Medidata announced plans to launch virtual trials as a part of its platform's clinical trial products, allowing patients to participate remotely in drug development trials.

Locations
Headquartered in New York City, the company has additional offices in the United States in Boston, Massachusetts; Iselin, New Jersey; Houston, Texas; San Francisco, California; Davis, California; San Mateo, California; and Cincinnati, Ohio. Internationally, Medidata maintains offices in London, England; Düsseldorf, Germany; Tokyo, Japan; Beijing, China; Shanghai, China; Seoul, South Korea; Singapore; Pune, India and Frankfurt, Germany.

Legal issues 
In September 2014, Medidata discovered that it had been the victim of a fraudulently induced transfer of nearly $4.8 million. The company filed an insurance claim for its loss, which was denied by its insurer, Federal Insurance Co., a subsidiary of Chubb Ltd. The insurer claimed that its policy only covered losses resulting from fraudulent entry or hacking into a computer system and that in this case the transfer was voluntary, while Medidata argued that the thief's actions did come within the policy's definition of covered losses. On July 21, 2017, a federal court in New York ruled that Medidata was entitled to coverage from Federal Insurance for the $4.8 million loss. Federal Insurance's appeal is pending.

On January 26, 2017, Medidata filed a lawsuit in federal court in New York against five former employees and Veeva Systems Inc., in which it accused Veeva of trade secret theft. The complaint alleges that Veeva induced former Medidata employees to reveal confidential information and trade secrets that belong to Medidata. On August 16, 2017, the court denied Veeva's motion to compel arbitration, and on September 20, 2017, Medidata filed its Second Amended Complaint, which names Veeva as the only defendant. The case is ongoing.

References

External links 
 
 Medidata NEXT website

Software companies based in New York (state)
Clinical trials
Clinical data management
Patient reported outcome measures
Publicly traded companies based in New York City
1999 establishments in New York (state)
Software companies of the United States
Technology companies
Cloud applications
Software industry
Medical research
Clinical research
Medical software
Health information technology companies
Cloud computing providers
Software companies established in 1999